Maule Air, Inc. is a manufacturer of light, single-engined, short take-off and landing (STOL) aircraft, based in Moultrie, Georgia, U.S. The company delivered 2,500 aircraft in its first 50 years of business.

History 
Belford D. Maule (1911–1995) designed his first aircraft, the M-1 starting at age 19. He founded the company Mechanical Products Co. in Napoleon, Michigan to market his own starter design. In 1941 the B.D. Maule Co. was founded, and Maule produced tailwheels and fabric testers. In 1953 he began design work, and started aircraft production with the "Bee-Dee" M-4 in 1957.

The company is a family-owned enterprise. Its owner, June Maule, widow of B. D. Maule, remained directly involved with factory production until her death in 2009 at the age of 92.

Products 
The aircraft produced by Maule Air are tube-and-fabric designs and are popular with bush pilots, thanks to their very low stall speed, their tundra tires and oleo strut landing gear. Most Maules are built with tailwheel or amphibious configurations, although the newer MXT models have tricycle gear.

Aircraft models

Gallery

References

External links 

 Maule Air, Inc. website
 Maule aircraft models

Aircraft manufacturers of the United States
Companies based in Colquitt County, Georgia
Vehicle manufacturing companies established in 1941
1941 establishments in Georgia (U.S. state)